Henri Berthoud (14 April 1877 – 3 August 1948) was a Swiss civil servant and member of the Council of States and National Council.

Berthoud was born in Neuchâtel and was the son of Jean-Edouard Berthoud and Georgine Léonie Panier. He was the father of Jean-Louis Berthoud, Denise and Raymonde Berthoud, brother-in-law of Louis Perrier, and son-in-law of Louis-Daniel Perrier.

Berthoud studied at the École supérieure de commerce of Neuchâtel along with scientific studies and earn a Ph.D. in chemistry.

Career
 1906      : Conseiller général
 1906–1919 : Conseiller communal of the city of Neuchâtel
 1906–1908 : Public works secretary
 1908–1912 : Public works director
 1915–1919 : Public works director (during which were built the "Collège des Parcs", the "Collège de la Maladière" and the "Hôpital des Cadolles")
 1912–1915 : Head of the Police
 1916–1941 : Member of the Council of States
 1923–1928 : Member of the National Council of Switzerland
 1931–1947 : Member of the National Council of Switzerland

Berthoud sat on the governing board of the "Conseil d'administration de la Chambre neuchâteloise du commerce et de l'industrie" and was president of the Finance Committee.

External links 
 

Members of the National Council (Switzerland)
People from Neuchâtel
1877 births
1948 deaths